Lampruna rosea is a moth of the subfamily Arctiinae. It was described by Schaus in 1894. It is found in Peru, Colombia, Venezuela, Costa Rica, Guatemala, Panama and Mexico.

References

Phaegopterina
Moths of North America
Moths of South America